Toronto Area Transit Operating Authority was a municipally-run transit agency in the Toronto, Ontario, Canada area that had responsibility for GO Transit. It acquired these responsibilities from Gray Coach, which originally operated the GO Transit bus service, and CN Rail, which originally operated the GO Transit train service. It was created on August 7, 1999, when the provincial government of Premier of Ontario Mike Harris downloaded provincial services. It was an arm of the Greater Toronto Services Board (GTSB). The downloaded service was disliked by Greater Toronto Area cities because of its lack of funds to expand or run the service. Opposition quickly mounted, but its elimination had to wait for Harris to leave office.

The agency ceased to exist on January 1, 2002, when GO Transit was returned to the province under the GO Transit Act, 2001.

The TATOA name was displayed on some GO Transit vehicles, but that was short-lived and painted over after the GO Transit Act came into effect.

GO Transit
Transit agencies in Ontario
Transport in Toronto
Organizations established in 1999
1999 establishments in Ontario
2002 disestablishments in Ontario